The 1881–82 season was the first season in which Bolton Wanderers competed in a senior competitive football competition. The club entered the FA Cup in October 1881, but were knocked out in the second round by Blackburn Rovers.

F.A. Cup

See also
Bolton Wanderers F.C. seasons

References

Bolton Wanderers F.C. seasons
Bolton Wanderers F.C.